Lau Mei Gwan (Chinese 劉美君 Prudence Liew) is the self-titled debut album of cantopop singer Prudence Liew, released on December 23, 1986.

Album information
While working as a film producer, Liew was faced with the task of coming up with a theme song to the movie Midnight Beauties (午夜麗人).  The film company eventually decided to cover a Korean pop ballad called "Dear J" by Lee Sun-hee and have Liew write the Cantonese lyrics as well as perform the vocals on the track.  The result was the lead single to the album, titled "Midnight Love 午夜情", about a forbidden love between a hostess club worker and her client.  The song garnered heavy airplay from radio stations across Hong Kong, and Liew was signed as the flagship artist to Current Records to record this album.

The second single off the album, "最後一夜 The Last Night", is a cover version of the song, "You're a Woman" by the German Europop group Bad Boys Blue.  The track featured a heavy dance beat that proved to be very popular with the Hong Kong disco scene.  The popularity of this song propelled Liew's status in the music scene and this song is still considered to be her signature song.

Many well-known composers and lyricists from Hong Kong and Taiwan contributed to this album, including Wong Jim (黃霑), Lam Manyee (林敏怡), Andrew Lam (林敏驄), and Richard Lam (林振強).  Liew herself composed and wrote the lyrics for the final track of the album, "Troubled Depressing Night 惆悵滄桑夜" as well as providing the lyrics to the aforementioned "Midnight Love 午夜情".

Reception
The album sold extremely well, having certified 10x platinum by the Hong Kong IFPI, selling over 500,000 copies.  Sales of this album set the record in Hong Kong for the most albums sold by a debuting local artist, a record that has yet to be defeated.  The album was also well received by critics, landing in many music critics' lists of top albums from the 1980s, and won two music awards as Album of the Year from RTHK Top 10 Gold Songs Awards and Jade Solid Gold Top 10 Awards in 1987.

Re-issues
Because of the quality of the album, it is still very popular among audiophiles in Hong Kong today.  Sony BMG (BMG Music which bought out Current Records in 1992), started re-issuing the album in several high-end-audio formats, including Super Audio CD, Extended Resolution Compact Disc and most recently, Blu-spec CD.

Re-issue formats
Prudence Liew (SACD), released 2002
Prudence Liew (Sony BMG – The Legendary Collection), released July 12, 2005
Prudence Liew (XRCD), release September 28, 2005
Prudence Liew (LPCD 45 Version), released July 24, 2007
Prudence Liew (Pure Gold Series), released April 9, 2009
Prudence Liew (Blu-Spec CD), release March 19, 2010

Track listing

References

1986 debut albums
Bertelsmann Music Group albums
Prudence Liew albums
Sony Music Hong Kong albums